Ciriaco Rocci (August 8, 1582 – September 25, 1651) was an Italian Catholic Cardinal and papal Apostolic Nuncio to Switzerland and Holy Roman Empire.

Life 
Rocci was born on 8 August 1582 in Rome and studied law before entering the service of the church.

In 1628 he was appointed Latin Archbishop of Patras, consecrated bishop on 2 July 1628 by Cardinal Giulio Cesare Sacchetti and sent to Switzerland by Pope Urban VIII as an Apostolic Nuncio. In 1629 he returned to Rome and was elevated to cardinal in pectore. That same year, Rocci came into possession of one part of the Villa Muti which had been divided upon the death of his uncle (on his mother's side) Cardinal Pompeo Arrigoni.

His elevation to cardinal was not revealed until 1633, prior to which he was appointed as nuncio to Holy Roman Empire. After revelation of his cardinalate, he returned to Rome and was appointed Cardinal-Priest of San Salvatore in Lauro.

He served as Cardinal Legate (the governor of the province) of Ferrara between 1637 and 1640.  He participated in the Papal conclave of 1644 which elected Pope Innocent X and between 1646 and 1647 he was appointed Camerlengo of the Sacred College of Cardinals.

Rocci died in Rome on 25 September 1651.

Episcopal succession

References

External links 
 (for Chronology of Bishops) 
 (for Chronology of Bishops) 

1582 births
1651 deaths
17th-century Italian cardinals
Cardinals created by Pope Urban VIII
Apostolic Nuncios to Switzerland
Apostolic Nuncios to the Holy Roman Empire
Latin archbishops of Patras